The Handley Page HP. 75 Manx was a British experimental aircraft designed by Handley Page that flew test flights in the early 1940s. It was notable for its unconventional design characteristics, being a twin-engine tailless design of pusher configuration.

Design and development
The Manx (named after a well-known breed of stub-tailed housecat) was built to participate in a flight research program investigating problems associated with tailless aircraft. The partially-swept wings supported the vertical stabilizers of a twin tail, with elevons for pitch and roll control.

Construction of the prototype was subcontracted to Dart Aircraft of Dunstable. There were serious issues encountered early in the development phase that caused a delay in the testing program. After it was delivered in 1939, redesigns had to be made because the Manx was too heavy, and there were also structural integrity issues with the main spar.

An unorthodox aspect of the Manx design incorporated into the aircraft was that the main undercarriage was retractable, while the nose gear remained fixed.

Taxi tests began in early 1940, but inspection revealed serious deterioration of the wing structures, which required extensive repair. These and further problems delayed the maiden flight until June 1943 (sources conflict as to whether it was 11 or 25 June.) The first flight was terminated early when the canopy was lost in mid-flight, but the pilot managed to land the plane safely. In December 1945 the Manx's regular crew were killed flying the Handley Page Hermes prototype. The Manx had accumulated only about 17 hours of flight time over approximately 30 flights when flight tests were finally terminated in April 1946. The sole example built was scrapped in 1952.

Specifications (HP.75 Manx)

See also

References

Notes

Bibliography

 Barnes, Chris. "Tailess Experimental". Aeroplane Monthly, January 1980, Volume 8 No. 1. pp. 4–9.
 Barnes, C. H. Handley Page Aircraft Since 1907. London: Putnam & Company, Ltd., 1987. .
 Clayton, Donald C. Handley Page, an Aircraft Album. Shepperton, Surrey, UK: Ian Allan Ltd., 1969. .
Brookes, Andrew. Victor Units of the Cold War. Oxford: Osprey Publishing, 2011.
 Jackson, A.J. British Civil Aircraft since 1919 Volume 2. Putnam & Company, Ltd., 1973 (2nd Edition).

External links

 Handley Page Manx – British Aircraft Directory
 Handley Page H.P. 75 Manx – British Aircraft Directory
 Handley Page HP.75 – British Aircraft of World War II
 History of the flying wing – Century of flight
 Handley Page HP.75 Manx – diseno-art.com

1940s British experimental aircraft
Manx
Twin-engined pusher aircraft
Aircraft first flown in 1943
Mid-wing aircraft
Tailless aircraft